StudentsFirst is a political lobbying organization formed in 2010 by Michelle Rhee, former school chancellor of Washington D.C. public schools, in support of education reform. The organization worked to pass state laws on issues such as expanding charter schools and teacher tenure reform. On March 29, 2016, it announced some of its state chapters would merge with 50CAN, and its Sacramento headquarters would downsize.

Policy positions
StudentsFirst organizes its policy agenda into three categories: "elevate teaching," "empower parents," and "govern well."

Under what it calls "elevate teaching," StudentsFirst has sought to eliminate the "last in, first out"—or LIFO -- seniority system for laying off public school teachers, based on the premise that such a system promotes a sense of "adult entitlement" among teachers. The organization also supports teacher evaluation systems based on improvement in student test scores, and does not believe such assessment systems cause teachers to alter the test scores.

"Empower parents" refers broadly to policies that allow for increased choice in where a student attends school, such as increasing accessibility to charter schools and providing opt-out options for students whose local public school is deemed "low-performing." StudentsFirst supports parent trigger laws, such as the California law that served as the plot for the movie Won't Back Down.

"Govern well" refers to policies in regards to school spending and resource allocation.

In January 2013, StudentsFirst published a "policy report card" evaluating each of the 50 states' public educations laws and rules against its own policy agenda.  The survey suggested states publicly finance charter schools, institute test-linked "performance pay packages" for teachers, repeal laws capping class sizes, and end teacher tenure.  No state received an "A" and only two states, Florida and Louisiana, received "B"s.

Political activity
According to the Los Angeles Times, StudentsFirst "spent nearly $2 million" in the 2012 general election cycle "to support 105 candidates across the country," 90 of whom were Republicans.

StudentsFirst supports the Student Success Act, legislation signed into law by Governor Rick Scott of Florida; Michigan legislation that will remove a teacher's tenure status after a bad evaluation; and similar proposals in Georgia, Indiana, Minnesota, Nevada, Ohio, Pennsylvania, and Tennessee. The organization's activities have been the subject of significant coverage with articles appearing in the Huffington Post, Fast Company  magazine, National Public Radio, Education News Colorado, The Washington Post, The New York Times, USA Today, and the DailyKos.

The organization has received seed money from the Eli and Edythe Broad Foundation, a backer of educational reform in school districts. As of May 2011, it had 21 staff members, and planned to engage in lobbying, the drafting of legislation and the backing of candidates for elected office.

In October 2011, StudentsFirst launched an initiative to defend Michigan Republican Paul Scott against a recall effort, dedicating nearly $70,000 to the initiative.  Scott's opponent in the upcoming race, Bobbie Walton, said StudentsFirst's involvement in the local election was "evidence of a national push to discredit teachers unions."  On November 8, 2011 Scott was recalled.

Former chairman Joseph P. Watkins was named Receiver of Schools in Chester, Pennsylvania in 2012.

Board of directors
As of September 2013, the members of StudentsFirst's Board of Directors were 
 Joel I. Klein
 Roland S. Martin
 Eva Moskowitz
 Michelle Rhee
 Jalen Rose
 Blair Taylor

Funding

Appearing on The Oprah Winfrey Show in 2010, Rhee announced a goal of raising $1 billion and garnering one million members. In actuality, the organization reported it have raised $7.8 million in its first fiscal year and $28.5 million in its second.

StudentsFirst has received funding from Michael Bloomberg as well as the Laura and John Arnold Foundation. The latter committed $20 million to the initiative in 2012, to be paid out over a five-year period.

See also 
 The New Teacher Project
 Teach for America

References

External links 
 Rhee-Style Education Reform, KQED
 StudentsFirst Website
 Teacher tenure reform, Big Rapids Daily Press, May 23, 2011.

2010 establishments in the United States
Educational organizations based in the United States
Lobbying organizations based in Washington, D.C.
Organizations established in 2010